La Gaceta is a weekly newspaper in Tampa, Florida, founded in 1922. Published in English, Spanish, and Italian, it is the only trilingual newspaper in the United States.

The paper was founded by Victoriano Manteiga, a former lector in the cigar factories of West Tampa and Ybor City, to serve the needs of the immigrant population of Tampa.

Later, his son Roland Manteiga took over as editor and publisher. Roland was very well connected, and his column "As We Heard It", became the local mid-20th century version of today's political blogs, often breaking stories and predicting events before the area's "major" newspapers.

Today, La Gaceta is still published weekly under the direction of Roland's son, Patrick Manteiga, who has assumed authorship of the "As We Heard It" column. Additional editors are Manuela Ball (Spanish Section) and Giuseppe Maniscalco (Italian Section). Other columnists include Arturo Rivera, Joe O'Neill, Richard Muga, Emily Carney, Paul Guzzo, Leonardo Venta, Harvey Grajales, Gene Siudut, Kyle Dion and Travis Puterbaugh.

External links
La Gaceta site
La Gaceta Online Archive at the University of South Florida

History of Tampa, Florida
Mass media in the Tampa Bay area
Newspapers published in Florida
Italian-American culture in Tampa, Florida
Italian-language newspapers published in the United States
Spanish-language newspapers published in Florida
Non-English-language newspapers published in Florida
Newspapers established in 1922
1922 establishments in Florida